Nordnorsk Kunstmuseum is a Norwegian visual arts museum in Northern Norway. The Northern Norwegian Museum of Art is responsible for the entire northern region and in 2010 established a separate department for the nationwide program.

History
Established as a foundation in 1985, the Northern Norway Art Museum moved to its current location in Tromsø in 2001.
The building was originally designed by architect Søren Andreas Wiese-Opsahl in 1917 to house post and telegraph offices. From 1967 the building was commissioned as a police station.

Through the years the Northern Norway Art Museum has presented thematic exhibitions on subjects as still life, Norwegian and Russian arts and crafts, Peder Balke and Sámi contemporary art. The museum has also presented solo exhibitions of artists like Marit Følstad, Kjell Varvin and Håkon Fageraas.

Collections
The museum presents different temporary exhibitions of both contemporary and historical art during the year, in addition to the permanent collection. The permanent collection contains approximately 2,200 works, of which only a small, representative amount is on display. The collection includes artworks from the late 18th century to the present day.

The museum also deposits art from the National Museum of Art, Architecture and Design, SpareBank 1 Northern Norway Art Foundation, Sparebankstiftelsen DNB NOR, Tromsø Kunstforening and private collections. Key artists include Peder Balke, Adelsteen Normann, Harriet Backer, Anna-Eva Bergman and Olav Christopher Jenssen.

Nordnorsk Kunstmuseum was named Norway's «Museum of the Year 2017» by Norges Museumsforbund, the Norwegian museum association.

Other locations
The museum has a special responsibility for the northern parts of Norway, and tours 2-3 smaller exhibitions in Nordland, Troms og Finnmark and Svalbard. In 2015 the satellite Kunsthall Svalbard opened in Longyearbyen, Svalbard as a dedicated arena for contemporary art. Queen Sonja of Norway did the official opening, and the first exhibition was Glacier by Joan Jonas.

Gallery

References

External links
 Nordnorsk Kunstmuseum's home page
 Travel and Leisure about Kunsthall Svalbard

Art museums and galleries in Norway
Buildings and structures in Tromsø
Museums in Troms og Finnmark
1985 establishments in Norway
Art museums established in 1985